Damak Model Higher Secondary School is higher school located at Damak-10, Jhapa, Nepal.

References

Educational institutions with year of establishment missing
Secondary schools in Nepal
Jhapa District